Stephen Daniel Mulhern (born ) is an English television presenter, magician, and comedian. He began his television career on CITV, presenting the children's shows Finger Tips (2001–2004) and Tricky TV (2005–2010). Mulhern has presented various television shows for ITV, including Britain's Got More Talent (2007–2019), Animals Do the Funniest Things (2007–2011), This Morning's Hub (2011–2014), Catchphrase (2013–present), Big Star's Little Star (2013–2018), In for a Penny (2019–present), and Rolling In It (2020–2021).

Early life and education 
Mulhern's parents were market traders. He attended St Bonaventure's in Forest Gate, East London.

Career

Magic 
Mulhern gained his interest in comedy and magic from his father, who taught him tricks when he was 11 years old. The family spent their holidays at Butlin's Minehead in Somerset, where Mulhern began performing in public. He became the youngest member of The Magic Circle, which brought about an appearance on Blue Peter in a piece about Harry Houdini. Mulhern was later suspended from The Magic Circle for revealing a magic trick on the children's  television programme Finger Tips. The suspension was eventually lifted.

After leaving school, he created a magic show under the title Stephen's Mega Mad Magic Show. Turned down at age 18 by Michael Barrymore for My Kind of People, he won another television talent show called The Big Big Talent Show which was hosted by Jonathan Ross, and as a result, in 1997 was invited to take part in the Royal Variety Performance at the Victoria Palace Theatre.

Mulhern has appeared on the Disney Channel and then on CITV alongside Holly Willoughby on Saturday Showdown. His television credits since have included The Quick Trick Show and more recently Tricky TV. In 2005, Mulhern created and presented the Channel 4 magic show Freaky. In 2006, he performed a magic routine in an episode of The Slammer and came in second place. The dance group Flawless, who went on to perform on Britain's Got Talent (a spin-off show of which Mulhern presents), came first. Mulhern's 2010 entertainment show Magic Numbers featured magic and illusions during the phone-in process.

For his Tricky TV series, he used glamour models and bodybuilders, or viewers of the programme and their mothers. He also often uses female celebrities. Most notable of these is his former Saturday Showdown co-host Holly Willoughby, who has assisted him on many occasions in a variety of illusions including being sawn in half and beheaded with a guillotine. Other celebrity assistants have included the singers Katherine Jenkins, Rachel Stevens, Louise Redknapp and the actress Mischa Barton.

Radio 
On 5 August 2012, Mulhern began co-presenter of Sunday breakfast from 9am to 12pm with  Emma Willis across the Heart Network. The duo occasionally present the Heart London Breakfast show when regular hosts, Jamie Theakston and Amanda Holden are away.

In 2021, Mulhern began presenting shows on Virgin Radio UK. He covered Graham Norton in the weekend morning 9:30am to 12:30pm slot in August and also presented a week of the Chris Evans Breakfast Show in December. Mulhern then returned to Virgin to host a week of Chris Evans Breakfast Show again in April 2022.

Television 

Mulhern began presenting on CITV in 1998. He co-hosted four series of Finger Tips with Fearne Cotton from 2001 until 2003 and with Naomi Wilkinson in 2004. He presented children's show Tricky TV from 2005 to 2010. He also co-hosted Holly & Stephen's Saturday Showdown (originally called Ministry of Mayhem) with Holly Willoughby from 2004 to 2006.

From 2006 to 2007, Mulhern hosted the ITV2 spin-off Dancing on Ice: Defrosted, while Phillip Schofield and Holly Willoughby hosted the main show.

From 2007 to 2019, Mulhern hosted ITV2 spin-off Britain's Got More Talent, which aired immediately after the main ITV show, which is hosted by Ant & Dec. Since 2013, Mulhern has become associated with the word 'unbelievable' which slowly became his catchphrase, usually used on Britain's Got More Talent as he walks offscreen at the end of a section, with Ant & Dec often mimicking him and is also known for saying "doosh!".

From 2009 to 2011, Mulhern narrated the ITV entertainment show Animals Do the Funniest Things.

Mulhern regularly presented inside 'The Hub', a small segment on the ITV daytime show This Morning. He most recently hosted the segment on Thursday and Friday mornings although had previously hosted on Wednesdays and Thursdays until the departure of Matt Johnson in the summer of 2013. Mulhern has occasionally presented the main show, standing in for the regular presenters.

In 2010, he hosted primetime game show Magic Numbers on ITV. Mulhern has hosted numerous episodes of The Big Quiz.

Since April 2013, Mulhern has presented a revived version of ITV game show Catchphrase. In September 2013, Mulhern began presenting ITV's Big Star's Little Star, a show which sees celebrities and their children compete to win up to £15,000 for charity.

On 27 October 2013, Mulhern began hosting a live Sunday morning show called Sunday Side Up on ITV. On 21 December 2013, Mulhern hosted entertainment special The Illusionists on ITV. On 14 September 2014, Mulhern guest hosted an episode of Sunday Night at the Palladium.

In early 2015, Mulhern presented the primetime ITV reality series Get Your Act Together. On 5 February 2015, he began presenting ITV2 panel show Reality Bites . In 2015, he presented The Magic Show Story a one-off special for ITV and The Saturday Night Story, a two-part series focusing on Saturday night television. In 2015, Mulhern presented Pick Me!, a daytime game show for ITV as well as ITV's annual charity telethon Text Santa. In March 2015, Mulhern became a victim of the Ant & Dec Undercover segment on Ant & Dec's Saturday Night Takeaway.

In February 2016, Stephen became the presenter of the 'Ant vs Dec' segment on Ant & Dec's Saturday Night Takeaway after replacing Ashley Roberts. In 2016, Mulhern presented Go for It, and co-hosted The Next Great Magician alongside Rochelle Humes for ITV. On 12 April 2018, it was announced that Mulhern would host The National Lottery Draws on ITV.

In 2019, Mulhern presented In For A Penny, which is based on a segment he presents on Ant & Dec's Saturday Night Takeaway of the same name.

In August 2020, Mulhern began presenting a new game show on ITV, Rolling In It, featuring both contestants and celebrities.

In February 2022, Mulhern guest presented Dancing On Ice whilst Phillip Schofield self-isolated from COVID-19.

In January 2023 it was reported that a reboot of the show Deal or No Deal would be hosted by Mulhern.

Filmography

Television

Radio

References

External links 
 
 

Living people
Butlins Redcoats
English game show hosts
English magicians
English male musical theatre actors
English people of Irish descent
English television presenters
Heart (radio network)
People educated at St Bonaventure's Catholic School
People from Minehead
People from Stratford, London
Year of birth missing (living people)